was a Japanese politician. Matsuno was born in Yamaga, Kumamoto, Kumamoto Prefecture in 1917. He served in the Imperial Japanese Navy as an officer at the end of World War II as he was attending Naval Accounting School.

Matsuno successively held numerous offices in post-war Japan:

 Director-General for the Prime Minister's Office from 1958 to 1959 under Nobusuke Kishi 
 Minister of Labor from 1959 to 1960 under Nobusuke Kishi 
 Director General of the Japan Defense Agency from 1965 to 1966 under Eisaku Satō
 Minister of Agriculture, Forestry and Fisheries 1966 under Eisaku Satō

He was Chairman of the Policy Affairs Research Council at Liberal Democratic Party, the Chairman of the Executive Council.

1917 births
2006 deaths
People from Kumamoto Prefecture
Keio University alumni
Imperial Japanese Navy officers
Members of the House of Representatives (Japan)
Government ministers of Japan
Japanese defense ministers
Imperial Japanese Navy personnel of World War II